Jelen or Jeleń ("deer" in several Slavic languages) is a surname and toponym.

People
 Alen Jelen (born 1970), Slovenian theatre and radio director, dramaturgist, actor, journalist
 Alois Jelen (1801–1857), Czech composer
 Antoni Jeleń (born 1964), Polish football player
 Ben Jelen (born 1979), Scottish-born American singer-songwriter
 Eric Jelen (born 1965), German tennis player
 Ireneusz Jeleń (born 1981), Polish football player
 Josef Jelen  (born 1914), Czech boxer
 Marija Brenčič Jelen (1919–2000), Slovenian poet and writer
 Mateusz Jeleń (born 1988), Polish football player
 Rudolf Jelen (1876–1938), Czech sports shooter
 Jelen (bumi), 15th-century monarch
 Zafer Yelen, Turkish footballer
 Janet Yellen (born 1946), American economist serving as the 78th United States secretary of the treasury

Places
 Jeleń (disambiguation), places in Poland
 Jelen, Nebraska, a community in the United States
 Jelen Do, Serbian village

Other
 Jelen pivo, a Serbian brand of beer
 Jelen Pivo Live, musical event

See also
 
 Yellen
 Yellin